’Azmut is a Palestinian village in the Nablus Governorate in the eastern West Bank, located five kilometers northeast of Nablus. According to the Palestinian Central Bureau of Statistics (PCBS), the village had a population of 2,724 inhabitants in mid-2006.

Location
It is bordered by Deir al Hatab and Al ‘Aqrabaniya to the east, Al Bahdan to the north, ‘Asira ash Shamaliya and Nablus to the west, and Deir al Hatab to the south.

History
One pottery sherd has been found from each of the Hellenistic and early Roman eras. Much more pottery has been found from the late Roman
and Byzantine eras.

Ottoman era
Incorporated into the Ottoman Empire in 1517 with the rest of Palestine, in 1596 the village appeared in Ottoman tax registers as being in the nahiya of Jabal Qubal in the liwa of Nablus. It had a population of 18 households and 2 bachelors, all Muslim. They paid a fixed tax-rate of 33.3 % on agricultural products, including wheat, barley, summer crops, olive trees, goats and beehives, in addition to occasional revenues and a press for olive oil or syrup - a total of 4,000 akçe.

In 1838, Edward Robinson noted Azmut as a village in the same area as Salim and Deir al-Hatab. All were Muslim villages, part of the El-Beitawy district, east of Nablus.

In 1870, Victor Guérin visited, after visiting Deir al-Hatab. About Azmut, he noted that it was: "a small village a little less in ruin the previous one. It must have succeeded also to an ancient locality, as is proved by a number of cisterns cut out from the rock, most of them without water, but one of which, among others, still serves the needs of the inhabitants. Two oualys are devoted to two different sheikhs."

In 1882, the PEF's Survey of Western Palestine  described Azmut as a "small village, standing on the slope of the hill, with cliffs on the west."

British Mandate era
In the 1922 census of Palestine conducted by the British Mandate authorities, Azmut had a population of 283  Muslims,  increasing at the time of the 1931 census to 307,  still all Muslim, in 70 houses.

In the 1945 statistics, Azmut had a population of 410, all Muslims, with 10,748 dunams of land, according to an official land and population survey. Of this, 343 dunams were plantations and irrigable land, 3,259 were used for cereals, while 23 dunams were built-up land.

Jordanian era
In the wake of the 1948 Arab–Israeli War, and after the 1949 Armistice Agreements, Azmut came  under Jordanian rule.

The Jordanian census of 1961 found 615 inhabitants.

1967, aftermath
Since the Six-Day War in 1967, Azmut has been under Israeli occupation along with the rest of the Palestinian territories.

After the 1995 accords, 59% of village land is defined as Area B, the remaining 41% is defined as Area C. The Israelis have confiscated hundreds of dunams of land from Azmut, primarily to construct military bases, in addition to 639 dunums of Azmuts land which went to construct the Israeli settlement of Elon Moreh.

References

Bibliography

 
 
 

 
  
 
 
  
 
  
 (Saulcy, 1854, vol 1, p. 99)

External links
 Welcome to Azmut  
Survey of Western Palestine, Map 12:  IAA, Wikimedia commons
  Azmut village profile,  Applied Research Institute–Jerusalem (ARIJ)
 Azmut, aerial photo, ARIJ

Nablus Governorate
Villages in the West Bank
Municipalities of the State of Palestine